The Sailing at the 1983 Southeast Asian Games was held between 31 May to 4 June at Changi Water Sport Complex.

Medal summary

Yachting

Boardsailing

Men's Water skiing

Women's Water skiing

Medal table

References
 https://eresources.nlb.gov.sg/newspapers/Digitised/Article/straitstimes19830603-1.2.129
 https://eresources.nlb.gov.sg/newspapers/Digitised/Article/straitstimes19830604-1.2.113
 https://eresources.nlb.gov.sg/newspapers/Digitised/Article/straitstimes19830605-1.2.78.27
 https://eresources.nlb.gov.sg/newspapers/Digitised/Article/straitstimes19830606-1.2.102

1983 Southeast Asian Games events